1 Cathedral Street is an historic building in Dunkeld, Perth and Kinross, Scotland. It is two storeys, with a three-window frontage.

It was formerly part of St George's Hospital with the adjacent The Ell House.

See also 
 List of listed buildings in Dunkeld And Dowally, Perth and Kinross

References 

Cathedral Street 1
Category B listed buildings in Perth and Kinross
1757 establishments in Scotland